The E-class trams are three-section, four-bogie articulated trams that were first introduced to the Melbourne tram network in 2013, built at the Dandenong works of Bombardier Transportation (later Alstom) with the propulsion systems and bogies coming from Bombardier/Alstom factories in Germany.

The E-class is part of the Tram Procurement Program, a Public Transport Victoria project aimed at increasing capacity and reliability of the tram network through the introduction of new trams, creation of new depot space, and upgrades to existing infrastructure. In September 2010, 50 were ordered with an option to purchase a further 100. In May 2015, a further 20 were ordered, followed by additional orders for 10 in May 2017, September 2018 and May 2019, taking the total to 100.

The first tram was delivered in June 2013 and, after testing, entered service on route 96 on 4 November 2013.

History

E1-class 
In July 2009, the Victorian Government called for expressions of interest for the construction of 50 new trams. The expression of interest stipulated that the trams had to be low floor, to comply with the Disability Discrimination Act, that 40% of the total contract was to be local content, and that the first were to enter service in 2012.

In October 2009, Alstom and Bombardier were shortlisted to bid for the contract. The invitation to tender stated the contract had been declared a strategic project, requiring a minimum 25% local manufacturing content, and 50% local content over the life of the contract, with 150 jobs expected to be created.

In September 2010, Bombardier was awarded a contract for 50 Flexity Swift low-floor trams, including maintenance to 2017. The contract included an option for a further 100 vehicles. They were to be built at Bombardier's Dandenong factory with aesthetic design by Bombardier's Brisbane-based Industrial Design team, with propulsion systems and bogies coming from Bombardier’s German factories in Mannheim and Siegen respectively. They were the first trams built in Australia in 12 years, and the first locally built Melbourne trams since the delivery of the last B-class in 1994.

A two-thirds mock up was produced for design input, and was unveiled on 24 August 2011; it was displayed at the 2011 Royal Melbourne Show. A seven-month delay in delivery was announced in August 2012, with Bombardier stating that design complexity had slowed down construction, and the E-class would be operating from July 2013, with the last tram to be delivered in 2018.

The first E-class tram arrived at the Preston Workshops of Yarra Trams on 28 June 2013, to begin final testing, and was publicly unveiled on 1 July 2013. Testing started in mid-July 2013, and by September 2013 there were two E-class trams at Preston Workshops undergoing non-passenger testing in preparation for introduction to service in late 2013. Two E-class trams entered service on route 96 on 4 November 2013 after an unveiling at Southbank Depot, with a further three in service by January 2014.

In July 2014, it was revealed that Yarra Trams would have to build more substations to cope with the large amount of power that the trams require. E class trams were introduced to route 11 in June 2015, being housed at East Preston tram depot. The Depot was changed to the recently upgraded Preston Workshops in April 2016. In November 2016, E-class trams were introduced on route 86, sharing the fleet with route 11  (and route 96 to a lesser extent), also from Preston Workshops.

E2-class 

In May 2015, the State Government announced it had ordered a further 20 E-class trams. These were built to an updated design with a focus on improved safety, and were designated E2-class  The design was updated in response to a fivefold increase in injuries relating to passengers mounting and alighting trams, a 50 per cent rise in falls onboard and an eight-year-high for serious injuries.

The redesign implemented measures such as glare reduction to allow improved road visibility for drivers and extra handholds and grab rails for passengers. In May 2017 a further 10 were ordered, taking the number of E2-class trams ordered to 30, at a cost of $274 million, with late model E1-class trams also being retrofitted with the new safety features.

In May 2019, a further 10 were ordered, which together with a previous additional order of another 10 in September 2019, brought the total E2-class trams ordered to 50. In October 2019, E-class trams were tested on Route 58.

Design 
One bogie is located under each end unit, and two are located under the centre unit. The swivelling bogies are enclosed by a "wheelbox" under seats in the passenger area, allowing the tram aisle to remain low-floor throughout. They have anti-slip flooring, air-conditioning, automatic audio-visual announcements, and a passenger capacity of 210.

In service 
E-class trams now operate on routes 11, 30, 58, 86 and 96, but are also used for special events at Melbourne Park, AAMI Park and the Melbourne Cricket Ground on route 70a during and since the 2015 Asian Cup. They are also used to transport spectators to and from Albert Park for the Australian F1 Grand Prix. They run express from Southern Cross Station to the Gates. 

E-class trams were introduced on route 58 on 19 December 2021.

Associated works
A package of works, the Tram Procurement Program was delivered by Public Transport Victoria to increase the capacity and reliability of Melbourne's tram network. This includes: the order of 50 trams; upgrades to route 96; upgrading the power system; improving accessibility on other low-floor routes; and the redevelopment of Preston Workshops and upgrades to Southbank depot to store and maintain E-class trams.

In anticipation of the E-class trams, a $24 million upgrade at Southbank depot was completed and included upgraded the maintenance and office facilities. Route 96 was upgraded for the E-class trams, accessible stops will be constructed, along with further segregation of trams from cars, and increased priority at intersections.

References

External links 

Articulated passenger trains
Melbourne tram vehicles
Train-related introductions in 2013
600 V DC multiple units
Multiple units of Victoria (Australia)
Bombardier Transportation multiple units